Ricardo Daniel Gutiérrez Hernández (born 17 June 1997) is a Mexican professional footballer who plays as a goalkeeper for Liga MX club Mazatlán.

Career statistics

Club

References

External links
 
 
 

Living people
1997 births
Association football goalkeepers
Liga MX players
Mazatlán F.C. footballers
Atlético Morelia players
Footballers from Michoacán
Mexican footballers